JanSport is an American brand of backpacks and collegiate apparel, now owned by VF Corporation, one of the world's largest apparel companies. JanSport is the world's largest backpack maker, and together, JanSport and The North Face, also owned by VF Corporation, sell nearly half of all small backpacks sold in the United States.

History
JanSport was founded in 1967 in Seattle, Washington, United States by Murray Pletz, his wife Janis "Jan" Lewis (for whom the company is named), and his father Norman Pletz. JanSport innovated with a panel-loading daypack, unlike traditional top-loading packs.

In 1975, JanSport introduced the first convertible travel pack, as well as its signature daypack. 

In 1972, the founders began inviting their friends to join their climb on Mount Rainier to what is now known as the longest consecutive group climb.  To this day, Jansport still holds the record of the most consecutive annual group climbs. In 2018, was their 46th annual Jansport Mount Rainier climb consisting of a team of 16 employees, retailers, international distributors, non-profit partners and media. 

In 1986, VF purchased JanSport's then parent, Blue Bell.

JanSport's corporate headquarters is in Denver Colorado, at VF Outdoor headquarters, where it shares offices with divisional siblings The North Face, Smartwool, Altra Running, Icebreaker, and Eastpak. A distribution facility in Everett, Washington, which had opened in 1971, closed in March 2012. JanSport's collegiate apparel warehouse in Appleton, Wisconsin closed in 2017.

JanSport started by developing the external frame backpack which used a metal frame with a cloth packsack attached to it. The products made include technical day packs and internal frame backpacks. Up until the early 1990s all JanSport packs were made in the United States.

References

External links
JanSport official web site
VF Corporation

Backpack Bags

VF Corporation
Camping equipment manufacturers
Clothing companies of the United States
Hiking equipment
Luggage brands
American companies established in 1967
Clothing companies established in 1967
Manufacturing companies established in 1967
1967 establishments in Washington (state)
1986 mergers and acquisitions
American brands
1990s fashion
2000s fashion